A flashover is the near simultaneous ignition of all combustible material in an enclosed area.

Flashover may also refer to:
Flashover (electrical), an electrical arc between exposed commutator segments in a motor or generator
Flashover (film), a 2007 documentary film concerning John Deacon's release from prison
Flashover Recordings, a trance music record label
Sympathetic detonation, or flashover, detonation of an explosive charge by a nearby explosion